Michael Koheleti Morgan (born 21 January 1995) is an Ireland international rugby league footballer who plays for the Canterbury-Bankstown Bulldogs in the Intrust Super Premiership.

Background
Morgan was born in Sydney, New South Wales, Australia. He is of Irish and Tongan descent. He played his junior rugby league for the Bankstown Bulls and attended Marist College Kogarah before being signed by the Canterbury-Bankstown Bulldogs.

Playing career

Early career
In 2011, Morgan played for the Bulldogs' Harold Matthews Cup side and was selected to play for the New South Wales under-16 side. In 2012 and 2013, he played for the Bulldogs' SG Ball Cup side and played for New South Wales under-18 in 2013, scoring a try in their 56-6 win over Queensland. From 2013 to 2015, Morgan played for the Bulldogs' NYC side, scoring 16 tries in 46 games. In 2016, he played for the Guildford Owls in the Sydney Shield.

2017
In 2017, Morgan re-joined the Bulldogs, playing for their Intrust Super Premiership side. In October, he was called up to the Ireland squad for the 2017 Rugby League World Cup after Toby King was ruled out through injury.

References

External links
Statistics at rugbyleagueproject.org
2017 RLWC profile

1995 births
Australian rugby league players
Australian people of Irish descent
Australian sportspeople of Tongan descent
Ireland national rugby league team players
Rugby league centres
Living people